Vermilion Provincial Park is a provincial park located in east-central Alberta, Canada, in the County of Vermilion River.  It is located on the outskirts of the town of Vermilion, which is at the junction of Highways 16 (Yellowhead) and 41 (Buffalo Trail), between Edmonton and Lloydminster.

History
The park was first constructed in the early 1950s, and opened to the public on May 29, 1953. Vermilion Provincial Park was the 7th park integrated into the Alberta Parks system. One of the key features of the park is that the Vermilion River was dammed to create an artificial lake (the 6.3 km long Vermilion Park Lake).

Nature
The environmental setting includes aspen parkland and prairie grassland biomes, with wildlife such as white-tailed deer, red fox, Franklin's ground squirrels, porcupines, ruffed grouse, harriers, red-tailed hawks, short-eared owls, Canada geese, great blue herons, American bitterns, common ducks, mink, muskrats, beavers, coyotes, Sprague's pipits and savannah and vesper sparrows.

The Vermilion River fish population consists of northern pike, fathead minnow, lake chub, brook stickleback (Culaea inconstans), longnose dace and white sucker.

Activities
The park is open year-round, but is only staffed during the summer (from May 15 to September 23).

There are a number of trails for cross-country skiing in winter and horseback riding during summer. The park also has 14.9km of maintained hiking and biking trails as well as 5km of paved paths that can be used for rollerblading. Named trails in the park include Wild Rose Trail, Cathedral Loop, Fescue Trail, and Lakeside Trail.

Fishing is also allowed in the  Vermilion River Reservoir, with a designated pond for trout fishing which is stocked every year by the Alberta Conservation Association.
Water based activities include canoeing, kayaking and sailing.

A year-round campground with all amenities is located in the park, as well as three group camping sites. A back country camping area is also available for rental. Several additional day use areas (including the CN station and one featuring a baseball diamond) are found in the park. A golf course is found in Vermilion, and a mini golf course is within the park limits.

The old CNR station has been relocated to the park, as well an old CNR caboose which is on display near the station.

Trivia
Beckie Scott, a cross country skier who won medals at both the 2002 and 2006 Winter Olympic Games, skied on these trails in her early years.

See also
List of provincial parks in Alberta
List of Canadian provincial parks
List of National Parks of Canada

References

External links 

Alberta Community Development - Park description

Provincial parks of Alberta
County of Vermilion River
1953 establishments in Alberta